This is a list of Portuguese words that come from Germanic languages. Many of these words entered the language during the late antiquity, either as words introduced into Vulgar Latin elsewhere, or as words brought along by the Suebi who settled in Gallaecia (Northern Portugal and Galicia) in the 5th century, and also by the Visigoths who annexed the Suebic Kingdom in 585. Other words were incorporated to Portuguese during the Middle Ages, mostly proceeding from French and Occitan languages, as both cultures had a massive impact in Portuguese during the 12th and 13th centuries. More recently other words with Germanic origin have been incorporated, either directly from English or other Germanic languages, or indirectly through French.

Many of these words are shared with the Galician language, with minor spelling or phonetic differences. It is divided into words that come from English, Frankish, Langobardic, Middle Dutch, Middle High German, Middle Low German, Old English, Old High German, Old Norse, Old Swedish, and Visigothic and finally, words which come from Germanic with the specific source unknown. Projections indicate over 600 Germanic words in Portuguese, with a tendency to increase due to English, German and other modern influences.

Some of these words existed in Latin as loanwords from other languages.  Some of these words have alternate etymologies and may also appear on a list of Galician words from a different language.  Some words contain non-Germanic elements. Any form with an asterisk (*) is unattested and therefore hypothetical.

Dutch
 bombordo: port side of a ship: from French babord "portside", from Dutch bakboord "left side of a ship", literally "back side of a ship" (from the fact that most ships were steered from the starboard side), from bak "back, behind", (from Germanic (*)bakam) + boord "board, side of a ship", see borde below (in Germanic section).  Also see estibordo "starboard" below in the Germanic section
 berbequim: carpenter's brace: from regional French veberquin (French vilebrequin), from Dutch wimmelken, from wimmel "auger, drill, carpenter's brace" + -ken, a diminutive suffix, see maniquí below in Middle Dutch section.

English
 bar (the beverage establishment)
 basquetebol or basquete (Brazil) = basketball
 bit, byte, and many other computing terms
 Champô, shampoo or xampu (Brazil) = shampoo
 cheque = Cheque (US English check)
 choque = shock
 clicar = to click
 clique = click
 estandarte = adj. standard
 clube = club
 cocktail or coquetel (Brazil) = cocktail
 cowboy
 deletar = to delete
 faroeste = far west, Western,
 fashion = adj., fashionable
 futebol = football
 hamburguer = cheeseburger, hot dog, hamburger, fast food
 interface = interface
 lanchonete = snack bar, from the English word "luncheonette"
 marketing = marketing
 mesmerizar = mesmerize
 mouse = computer mouse
 Nylon or náilon (Brazil) = nylon
 revolver = revolver
 realizar = to realize
 sanduiche, sanduíche, sandes = sandwich
 show = adj., something with showlike qualities, spectacular
 telemarketing, know-how
 teste (academic) = test 
 turista = tourist
 vagão = wagon
 voleibol = volleyball

Frankish
 aguentar = to endure, bear, resist: from Italian agguantare "to retain, take hold of" (originally "to detain with gauntlets"), from a- + guanto "gauntlet", from Frankish (*)want (see guante below) + verbal suffix -are (suffix changed to -ar in Spanish).
 alojar = to lodge, to house, to provide hospitality: from Old French loge, see lonja below.
 alojamento = lodging (hospitality): from Old French logo "dwelling, shelter", from Frankish (*)laubja "covering, enclosure", from Germanic (*)laubja "shelter" (implicit sense "roof made of bark")
 loja = market, building where merchants and sellers gather: from Old French logo "dwelling, shelter", from Frankish (*)laubja "covering, enclosure", from Germanic (*)laubja "shelter" (implicit sense "roof made of bark"), from the IE root (*)leup- "to peel."
 bordar = to embroider: from Frankish (*)bruzdon (source of Old French brouder, brosder and French broder), from Germanic (*)bruzd- "point, needle", from the IE root (*)bhrs-dh-, from (*)bhrs-, from (*)bhar-, "point, nail."
 canivete = penknife, Swiss army knife: from Frankish *knif via old Fra canivet
 crossa or croça = crosier (religion): from Frankish *krukkja (stick with a bent extremity) akin to French crosse, Dutch kruk, German Krücke, English crutch, Norwegian krykkja.
 destacar, destacamento (military) = to detach troops: from French détachar (influenced by Spanish atacar), from Old French destachier "to unattach", from des- "apart, away" + atachier, a variation of estachier, from estaca, from Frankish stakka, see estaca below in Germanic section.
 destacar = to stand out, to emphasize: from Italian staccare "to separate", from Old French destacher, destachier, see destacar above.
 escanção = cupbearer, sommelier from Old Frankish *skankjo 'to offer a drink'
 estandarte = noun. a military standard: from Old French estandart, probably from Frankish (*)standhard "standard that marks a meeting place", (implicit sense: "that which stands firmly"), from (*)standan "to stand", (from Germanic (*)standan, from the IE root (*)sta- "to stand".) + (*)hard "hard, firm", see ardid below in Germanic section.
 guante = glove, gauntlet: from Catalan guant "gauntlet", from Frankish (*)want "gauntlet."
 loja = market, building where merchants and sellers gather: from Old French logo "dwelling, shelter", from Frankish (*)laubja "covering, enclosure", from Germanic (*)laubja "shelter" (implicit sense "roof made of bark"), from the IE root (*)leup- "to peel."
 raspar [v] = to scrape, tear, shave: from  Frankish *hraspōn, from Proto-Germanic *hraspōną, a derivative of Proto-Germanic *hrespaną (“to tear”), from Proto-Indo-European *(s)krebʰ- (“to turn; bend; shrink”). Related to Old High German raspōn (“to scrape together; rasp”), Middle Dutch raspen, Middle Low German raspen, Old English ġehrespan (“to plunder”). https://en.wiktionary.org/wiki/r%C3%A2per
 raspadinha = scratch card: same as above

German
 acordeão = accordion from akkordeon
 Báltico = baltic from Baltisch
 benzina = benzine from benzin
 burgomestre = (City)mayor from Bürgermeister
 chic or chique = Chic from Schick
 chope = draft beer from shoppen
 chucrute = coleslaw from sauerkraut
 cobalto = cobalt from Kobold
 estilístico = stylistic from Stylistik
 faustebol = faustball
 caputar = broken 
 LSD (alucinogénio) = LSD from Lysergsäurediethylamid
 metapsicológico, metapsicologi = metapsychology from Metapsychologie (S. Freud)
 plancton = plancton from Plankton
 poltergeist = poltergeist from Poltergeist
 pragmatismo = pragmatism from Pragmatismus
 propedêutico = introductory from Propädeutik
 protoplasma = protoplasm from Protoplasma
 Quartzo = quartz from Quarz
 Rösti (culinária) = rösti from Rösti (Swiss dish of grated potatoes formed into a small flat cake and fried)
 sabre = sabre from Sabel
 social-democrata = social democrat from Sozialdemokrat
 valsa = waltz from Walzer, walzen
 vampiro = vampire from Vampir
 Vermouth or Vermute = vermouth from Vermut (drink)
 Zinco = zinc from  Zink

Latin words in Portuguese of Germanic origin
 bisonte (from L bisont-,bison from Gmc, akin to OHG wisant, aurochs)
 feudal (from Latin feodum, feudum of Gmc origin, akin to OE feoh, cattle, property)
 filtro; filtrar = "filter; to filter" from ML filtrum felt from Gmc, akin to OE felt, felt
 instalar (from ML installare from stallum of Gmc origin, akin to OHG stal, stall)
 sabão = "soap" from Latin sapon-, sapo, soap from Gmc

Langobardic
 palco = a balcony, balcony of a theater: from Italian palco, from Langobardic palk "scaffolding", from Germanic (*)balkōn "beam, crossbeam", see balcão below in Germanic section.

Middle Dutch
 baluarte = bulwark: from Old French boloart "bulwark, rampart, terreplein converted to a boulevard", from Middle Dutch bolwerc "rampart",
 amarrar = to moor a boat, to tie, to fasten: from French amarrer, "to moor", from Middle Dutch aanmarren "to fasten", from aan "on" (from Germanic (*)ana, (*)anō, from the IE root (*)an-) + marren "to fasten, to moor a boat."
 Derivatives: amarra 'mooring', amarração 'binding, strong emotional bond, emotional relationship, mooring', amarrado 'determined, obstinate, bound, moored', amarradura 'mooring place, knot or tool'
 manequim = a mannequin, dummy, puppet: from French mannequin, from (probably via Catalan maniquí) Dutch manneken, mannekijn "little man", from Middle Dutch mannekijn, from man "a man" (see alemán below in Germanic section) + the diminutive suffix -ken, -kin, -kijn, from West Germanic (*)-kin (cf. Modern German -chen)
 rumo = direction, course, route, pomp, ostentation: from Old Spanish rumbo "each of the 32 points on a compass", from Middle Dutch rume "space, place, rhumb line, storeroom of a ship", from Germanic rūmaz "space, place", from the IE root (*)reu- "space, to open".

Middle High German

Middle Low German

Old English
 arlequim = harlequin: from Italian arlecchino, from Old French Herlequin "mythic chief of a tribe", probably from Middle English Herle king, from Old English Herla cyning, Herla Kyning literally King Herla, a king of Germanic mythology identified with Odin/Woden.  Cyning "king" is from Germanic (*)kunjan "family" (hence, by extension royal family), from the IE root (*)gen- "to birth, regenerate".
 bote = a small, uncovered boat: from Old French bot, from Middle English bot, boot, from Old English bāt, from Germanic (*)bait-, from the IE root (*)bheid- "to split".
 caneco = jug: from Old English *can- derived from cunnan
 caneca = mug: *see above 'can'
 leste = east: from French est, from Middle English est, from Old English ēast, from Germanic (*)aust-, from the IE root (*)awes-, aus "to shine".
 norte = north: from Old French nord, from Old English north, from Germanic (*)north-, from the IE root (*)nr-to "north", from (*)nr- "wikt:under, to the left"  
 oeste = west: from Middle English west, from Old English west, from Germanic (*)west-, from (*)wes-to-, from (*)wes-, from (*)wespero- "evening, dusk" 
 sul = south (combining form): from Old French sud "south", from Old English sūth, from Germanic (*)sunthaz, from the IE root (*)sun-, swen-, variants of (*)sāwel- "sun" 
 sudeste = 'southeast' *see above sud+est
 sudoeste = 'southwest' *see above sud+west

Old High German
 agrafo = staple, stitch from French 'agrafe', from OHG chrapfo
 agrafar [v] = to staple, to stitch (a wound, a cut, piece of fabric) from French 'agrafer', from OHG chrapfo
 banca =  bench: see banco= bench below
 banco =  bench: from Old High German banc "bench, board"
 banco = bank: from French banque "bank", from Italian banca "bench, money changer's table", from Old High German banc, see banco= bench above
 feltro = felt, from OHG 'filz'or Frankish 'filtir'
 feltrar, enfeltrar [v] = to tangle or mat together, to turn smthg. into felt

Old Norse
 bife = steak, beefsteak: from English beefsteak, from beef (ultimately from Latin bōs, bovis "cow", from the IE root (*)gwou- "ox, bull, cow" ) + steak, from Middle English steyke, from Old Norse steik "piece of meat cooked on  a spit", from Germanic (*)stik-, see estaca below in the Germanic section.

Old Swedish

Visigothic
 agasalhar [v] = from Visigothic *gasalja (partner, colleague)
 agasalho = coat, warm clothes. From Visigothic *gasalja
 broa = 'corn and rye bread' from Visigothic *brauth
 esgrima = fencing, from Visigothic *skirmja (protection)
 esmagar (v) = to smash, squeeze, crush or grind. From Suebian *magōn 'stomach'
 gabar (v) = to flatter, to bray, to boast, to brag about. From Suebian  *hurnjanan 'to blow a horn'
 grampo = clamp, clip, cramp. From *kramp
 grampear, grampar [v] = to clamp, to staple * same as above
 grampa = clip, metal hook, clasp * same as above
 carampão = cramp, clench * same as above
 grampeador = stapler * same as above
 gravar (v) = to carve, record, inscribe. From Suebian/OGrm  *graba 'graft'
 gravura = engraving, etching. From *graba 'graft'
 gravação= recording (voice/music/audiovisual). From *graba 'graft'
 guarda = guard, bodyguard, protection: from Visigothic wardja "a guard", from Germanic wardaz, from the IE root (*)wor-to-, see guardar below in Germanic section.
 guardião = guardian: from Visigothic wardjan accusative of wardja, see guardia above.
 atacar (v) = to attack: Old Italian attaccare "to fasten, join, unite, attack (implicit sense: to join in a battle)", changed from (*)estacar (by influence of a-, common verbal prefix) "to fasten, join", from Visigothic stakka "a stick, stake", from Germanic (*)stak-, see estaca in Germanic section.
 ataque = attack, raid. Same as above
 faísca = spark, from Visigothic or Suebian *falwiskan. From medieval 'falisca', cognate of Swedish falaska, Mid-High German valwische (*falwiskō), Norse fọlski.
 faiscar (v) = lightning, sparking. Same as above
 fita = ribbon, tape. From Visigothic/Suebian *veta 'ribbon'
 gavião = hawk, from Visigothic *gabila, akin to German Gabel 'fork'.
 rapar (v) = to shave (hair): from Visigothic *𐌷𐍂𐌰𐍀𐍉𐌽r=hrapōn, from Prot-Germanic *hrapōną||to scrape, from Indo-European *(s)kreb-||to turn; to touch.
 rapado = shaved head, skinhead
 tosquiar = to shear, to cut very short, from Visigothic *skairan

Germanic
 abandonar = to abandon: from Old French a bandon, from a + bandon "control" from ban "proclamation, jurisdiction, power", from Germanic (*)banwan, (*)bannan  "to proclaim, speak publicly"  
 abandono = abandonment, solitude
 abandonado = abandoned, rejected, derelict
 abordar = to board a ship, to approach, to undertake: from a- + bordo "side of a ship", variation of borde, see borde below
 abotoar = to button: from a- + botão "button", see botão below
 abrasar = to burn, to parch: from a- + brasa "a coal, ember" (see brasa below) + the verbal suffix -ar
 aguentar = "to put up with" (< maybe It agguantare, from guanto "gauntlet" < Old Provençal < OFr guant < Frankish *want)
 aguardar = to wait, wait for: from a- + guardar, see guardar below.
 alemão = of Germany (adjective), the German language: from Late Latin Alemanni, an ancient Germanic tribe, from Germanic (*)alamanniz (represented in Gothic alamans), from ala- "all" + mannis, plural of manna-/mannaz "man" (Gothic manna) from the IE root (*)man- "man" 
 ardil = trick, scheme, ruse: from Old Spanish ardid "risky undertaking in war", from Catalan ardit (noun) "risky undertaking, strategy", from ardit (adjective) "daring, bold", from a Germanic source represented in Old High German harti "daring, bold" and hart "hard", both from the IE root (*)kor-tu- .
 arenque = herring: possibly via French hareng, from Germanic (compare Old High German hārinc).
 harpa = a harp: from French: harpe, from Germanic (*)harpōn-.
 arrimar = to approach: possibly from Old French arrimer, arimer "to arrange the cargo in the storeroom of a ship", from Germanic (*)rūmaz "room"
 atrapar = to trap, to ensnare: from French attraper, from Old French a- + trape "trap", from Germanic (*)trep- (seen in the Old English træppe) from the IE root (*)dreb-, from (*)der- "to run."
 bala = a bullet: Italian balla/palla, from Germanic (*)ball-, see beisebol above in Old English section.
 balear = "to shoot"
 balcão = a balcony: from Italian balcone, from Old Italian balcone "scaffold", from Germanic (*)balkōn "beam, crossbeam", from the IE root (*)bhelg- "beam, board, plank."
 balão = a large ball: from Italian ballone, pallone, balla (see bala above) + -one, an augmentive suffix, related to and possibly the source of Spanish -ão (in balão). see here.
 banda = ribbon, band, sash: from Old French bande "knot, fastening", from Germanic '*band-', from the IE root (*)bhondh-, from (*)bhendh-
 banda = band, troop, musical group: from Germanic '*bandwa-', "standard, signal", also "group" (from the use of a military standard by some groups), from the IE root (*)bha- "to shine" (implicit sense "signal that shines").
 bandeira = banner: from Vulgar Latin (*)bandaria "banner", from Late Latin bandum "standard", from Germanic (*)bandwa, see banda = group below
 bandido = bandit, gangster: from Italian bandito "bandit", from bandire "to band together", from Germanic *banwan, see abandonar above
 banco = "bench; bank" (OFr bank < Germanic *banki)
 banqueiro = "banker, financier"
 banca = "bench, seat"
 bancada = "row of seats, stall"
 Abancar = "to settle somewhere"
 banquete = a banquet: rom Old French banquet, diminutive of banc "bench, long seat", of Germanic origin, of the same family as the Old High German banc, see banco= bench above in Old High German section.
 banquetear = "to feast, to have a banquet"
 barão, baronesa, baronato = "baron, baroness, baronet"
 bisonte = Bison bison: from Latin bisontem (accusative of bison) "wisent (Bison bonasus)", from Germanic (*)wisand-, wisunt- (Old High German wisant, wisunt).
 branco = white, white person, blank: from Vulgar Latin (*)blancus, from Germanic (*)blank- "to shine", from the IE root.
 briga = fight, scuffle: from Gothic *Brika-, Old High German Brech-en, Anglo-Saxon break. :Derivatives: brigar [v] 'to fight'
 bloco = a block, a bloc: from French bloc, from Middle Dutch blok "trunk of a tree", from a Germanic source represented in the Old High German bloh.
 bloqueio = "roadblock, blockade"
 bloquear = "to block, to veto, to stop"
 bloqueado = "something or someone which is blocked, halted, trapped"
 boémio or boêmio (Brazil) = a bohemian, of Bohemia, vagabond, eccentric, Gitano, Gypsy: from bohemio/Bohemia (from the belief that the Gitanos came from Bohemia), from Latin bohemus, from Boihaemum, literally "place of the Boi/Boii (from Celtic, see bohemio here) + Latin -haemum "home", from Germanic (*)haima "home", from the IE root (*)koi-mo-
 bola = ball from Proto-Germanic *balluz, *ballô (“ball”), from Proto-Indo-European *bʰoln- (“bubble”), from Proto-Indo-European *bʰel- (“to blow, inflate, swell”)
 bolas = colloquial bollocks, coward, popular interjection idiom 'ora bolas!' oh my! or damn it!, to express frustration or disapproval. From Proto-Germanic *balluz
 borda = border, edge: from Old French bord "side of a ship, border, edge", from Frankish
 bordar = "to knit"
 bordado = "knit work"
 bosque = forest, woods: from Catalan of Provençal of Old French bosc, from Germanic (*)busk- "brush, underbrush, thicket" (source of Old High German busc).
 bosquejo = a sketch, outline, rough draft: from Spanish bosquejar "to sketch, to outline", probably from Catalan bosquejar from bosc, see bosque above.
 bota = a boot: from or simply from the same source as French botte "boot", from Old French bote "boot", probably from the same source as Modern French pied bot "deformed foot" in which bot is from Germanic (*)būtaz, from the IE root (*)bhau- "to strike", see botar below.
 botar = to throw, to bounce, to jump: from Old French boter, bouter "to open, to hit, to strike, to perforate", from Romance bottare "to strike, to push, to shove", from Germanic (*) buttan "to hit, to strike" from the IE root (*)bhau- 
 botão = button: from Old French boton, bouton "button", from boter, bouter "to open, perforate", see botar above
 bóia = a buoy: probably from Old French boie, from Germanic, possibly from Old High German bouhhan, from Germanic (*)baukna- "signal", from the IE root (*)bha- "to shine" 
 brasa = a coal, ember: from Old French brese "a coal" (Modern French braise), probably from Germanic (*)bres-, (*)bhres-, from the IE root (*)bhreu-   
 buraco = from Proto-Germanic burō, burōną 'hole'
 chouriço, choiriça = Latinezed SAURICIUM, from Suebian/Gothic SAURAZ 'dried, smoked'
 churrasco, churrasqueira, churrascaria, churrascar[v] = from Suebian/Gothic SAURUS
 estaca = a stake: from Germanic (*)stak-, from the IE root (*)steg- "pale, post pointed stick".
 estibordo = starboard side of a ship: from Old French estribord "starboard", (Modern French tribord), from a Germanic source (confer Old English stēorbord).  From Germanic (*)stiurjō "to steer", + Germanic
 faca = knife from a Germanic source, uncertain if Old German happa (hatchet, sickle) or Frankish *happja, cognate of French hache, Spanish hacha, English hatchet or axe
 Derivatives: facalhão 'eustace', faqueiro 'cutlery or cutlery cabinet', facada 'stabbing', colloquial facada nas costas 'to stab (someone) behind the back'
 gaita = bagpipe Uncertain, but likely from Old Suebian, akin to Visigothic *agaits- 'goat' from  Proto Indo-European *ghaido-. Most logical origin as bagpipes were traditionally made from goats skin.
 Derivatives: gaiteiro '(bag)piper', gaita 'penis, or swearword akin to "cock"'(colloquial), gaita-de-foles, gaita-de beiços, 'different types or names for bagpipes, gaitar 'to sob or to fail an exam' (colloquail).
 grupo = group: From Italian gruppo, from a Germanic word represented by Old High German kropf "beak."
 Derivatives: agrupar 'to group, to organise into a section', agrupado 'part of a group', agrupamento 'act of grouping, a team'.
 guardar = to guard, watch over, keep, observe (a custom): from Germanic (*)wardōn "to look after, take care of", from the IE root (*)wor-to-, "to watch", from (*)wor-, (*)wer- "to see, watch, perceive" 
 oboé = an oboe: from French hautbois from haut (ultimately from Latin altus "high") + bois "wood", see bosque above.
 roca = roc, spindle: from Gothic *rukka
 Derivatives: enrocar[v], rocar[v], 'to spindle', enrocamento 'riprap'
 saco, sacola = bag, sack, rucksack
 sacar = to snap, to extract, to snatch, to withdraw (i.e. money from an ATM or account)
 saque = withdrawal, theft
 ressaque, ressacar = money order, to collect a money order (i.e. Forex)
 saxónico, saxão = Saxon
 sala, salinha, saleta = a room: from Germanic sal- "room, house", from the IE root (*)sol- "hamlet, human settlement."
 salão = main room of a house (see sala above) + -on, augmentive suffix.
 saxofone = "saxophone"
 sopa = soup (it comes from Sanskrit suppa)
 sul = south
 sudeste = southeast
 sudoeste = southwest
 sueco = Swedish
 suisso, suíço= Swiss
 suíno = swine, pig from Proto-Germanic *swinan 'pig'
 suinicultor, suinocultor = pig farmer from Proto-Germanic swinan + Latin cultor
 suinicultura = porcine breeding from Proto-Germanic swinan + Latin colere
 suinicídio = pig killing from Proto-Germanic swinan + Latin cidium
 tacho = pot, pan
 taco = stick, chalck
 tacão = heel
 talo, talão = stem, branch, heel
 tampão, tampon = tampon
 tampa = "top, lid"
 tapar = to cover, to hide
 teta, tetinha, tetona, tetão = tit, breast
 teutónico = teutonic, powerful
 trampa = a trap: possibly from Germanic, from the same derivation as trampolín (see below) and atrapar (see above).
 trampolim = a trampoline: from Italian trampolino "trampoline" (implicit sense: game of agility on stilts), from trampoli, plural of a Germanic word (*)tramp- (such as German trampeln and Old High German trampen, both meaning "to tread, trample"), from the IE root (*)dreb-,
 toalha = towel
 toalhete = "handtowel"
 toalhinha = "small towel"
 toldo = tarpaulin, cover
 toldar = to mist up, to darken, to sadden
 trepar = to climb, to copulate
 trepada = (informal) shag
 trombone = trombone
 tromba = snout, face
 trombudo = someone unfriendly looking
 tromba d'água = gusty showers
 trombão, trompão = thicker part of a fishing rod
 trombar = to sip down food, to scoff up
 tropa = troop
 atropar = to gather troops
 trupe = group, band, gang, student group, artistic group
 trupar = to knock someone's door
 trotar = to run, a horse running
 tungsténio = tungsten
 vanguarda = vanguard: from Old Spanish avanguardia, from Catalan avantguarda from avant "before, advance", (from Latin ab- + ante "before") + guarda "guard", from Germanic wardaz, see guardia above in Visigothic section.
 vagão, vagonete, vagoneta = "wagon"
 valquiria = valkyrie
 vandalo = "vandal, destructive person"
 vandalismo = "vandalism" (second element only)
 varão, varonil = "male, manly"
 venda = blindfold, from Proto-Germanic *binda; see Old High German binta
 vermute = vermuth
 wagneriano = "Wagnerian"

Names

Forenames
Ancient Roman-derived names are the most numerous in Portugal and Portuguese-speaking countries. Together with Germanic-derived names they constitute the majority of those (and similarly to most European/Western countries inherited also a number of ancient Greek and Hebrew names) today:
 Alberto, Adalberto = from the Germanic name Adalbert, composed of the elements adal "noble" and beraht "bright". This name was common among medieval German royalty. Used in Western Europe mainly: Aubert (French), Adalbert, Adelbert, Albrecht (German), Adalbert (Polish), Adelbert, Albertus (Dutch), Adalberht, Adalbert, Albertus (Ancient Germanic), Alpertti, Altti, Pertti (Finnish), Abbe, Abe (Frisian), Alberte (Galician), Adalberto, Alberto (Italian), Bèr (Limburgish), Albertas (Lithuanian), Adalberto, Alberto (Spanish)
 Albertina, Alberta = same as above
 Albina = Portuguese, Italian, Spanish, Russian, Slovene, Polish, German, Ancient Roman form of 'ALBINUS'
 Adelaide = from Germanic Adalheidis, which was composed of the elements adal "noble" and heid "kind, sort, type". It was borne in the 10th century by Saint Adelaide, the wife of the Holy Roman Emperor Otto the Great.
 Adelardo, Abelardo = from the ancient Germanic name Adalhard, composed of the elements adal "noble" and hard "brave, hardy
 Adélia, Adelina, Adele, Aline = Portuguese, Italian, Spanish, Romanian, German, Ancient Germanic *ADELA (Latinized)
 Adelino = from Germanic “Athal-win”, meaning of noble birth
 Ademar =
 Adolfo =
 Adosinda = from a Visigothic name derived from the Germanic elements aud "wealth" and sinþs "path".
 Adriano = Portuguese for Adrian in English, Romanian, Polish, German, Swedish, Norwegian, Danish, Russian, form of 'Hadrianus'
 Afonso = from Ancient Germanic Adalfuns, Alfons, Hadufuns, Hildefons. Used in Western Europe
 Afonsina =
 Agildo =
 Agnaldo =
 Aldo =
 Alda, Aldina = originally a short form of Germanic names beginning with the element ald "old", and possibly also with adal "noble"
 Alfredo =
 Aloísio =
 Álvaro = cognate of Nordic ALVAR. From Ancient Germanic Alfher, Alfarr, name composed of the elements alf "elf" and hari "army, warrior". Mainly Nordic= Alvar (Estonian), Elvar (Icelandic), Alvar (Swedish), Alvaro (Spanish)
 Alzira = relatively rare name. 'Alzira' or 'Alzire' is a Germanic name meaning `Beauty, Ornament`
 Amalia, Amália, Amélia, = Portuguese, Italian, Romanian, Dutch, German, from Latinized form of the Germanic name 'Amala', a short form of names beginning with the element amal meaning "work".
 Amaro =  from the Germanic name 'Audamar', derived from the elements aud "wealth, fortune" and meri "famous". Variants: Otmar (Czech), Othmar, Otmar, Ottmar, Ottomar (German), Amaro (Spain, specially Galicia and Asturias)
 Américo = Portuguese form of Ancient German 'Emmerich'. In other languages: Emery, Amery, Emory (English), Émeric (French), Emmerich (German), Imre, Imrus (Hungarian), Amerigo (Italian), Imrich (Slovak)
 Anselmo = from the Germanic elements ans "god" and helm "helmet, protection". Used in Western Europe
 Arlete = variation of French Arlette, from Germanic 'Herleva' possibly a derivative of hari "army", era "honour", or erla "noble" (or their Old Norse cognates). This was the name of the mother of William the Conqueror, who, according to tradition, was a commoner.
 Armando, Armindo = a derivation of Herman, from Ancient Germanic Hariman, Herman, Hermanus
 Armanda, Arminda = same as above
 Arnaldo = from Proto-Germanic Arnold, used in Western Europe = Arnau (Catalan), Arnoud, Aart, Arend (Dutch), Arnold, Arn, Arnie (English), Arnaud (French), Ane, Anne (Frisian), Arnold, Arend, Arndt, Arne (German), Nöl, Nölke (Limburgish)
 Arnaldina =
 Anselmo = Portuguese variation of German, English (Rare), Ancient Germanic 'ANSELM' from the elements ans "god" and helm "helmet, protection".
 Astolfo =
 Ataúlfo =
 Aubri = from the Germanic Alberich, derived from the elements alf "elf" and ric "power".
 Austragésilo =
 Baldemar, Baldomero = from Ancient Germanic Baldomar, derived from the elements bald "bold, brave" and meri "famous
 Balduíno =
 Belmiro =
 Beltrão = from the Germanic element beraht "bright" combined with hramn "raven. Used in Western Europe: Beltran (Catalan) Bertrand (English), Bertrand (French) Bertram (German), Bertrando (Italian)
 Barbara = Portuguese, English, Italian, French, German, Polish, Hungarian, Slovene, Croatian, Late Roman derived from Greek βαρβαρος (barbaros) meaning "foreign"
 Bernardo = from the Germanic name Bernard, derived from the element bern "bear" combined with hard "brave, hardy"
 Bernardino, Bernardim = Same as above
 Bernardina, Bernadete, Bernardete = Same as above
 Branca, Bianca = from the Germanic word "blanc" (white, fair). European variants: Blanka (Croatian), Blanka (Czech), Blanche (English), Blanche (French) Branca (Galician), Bianka (German), Bianka, Blanka (Hungarian), Bianca (Italian), Bianka, Blanka (Polish), Bianca (Romanian), Blanka (Serbian), Blanka (Slovak), Blanca (Spanish)
 Bruno = Portuguese, German, Italian, French, Spanish, Croatian, Polish, from Ancient Germanic element brun "armour, protection" or brun "brown"
 Brunilde = from Ancient Germanic variant of 'BRÜNHILD'
 Carlos, Carlo = from the Germanic name Karl, which was derived from a Germanic word meaning "man". An alternative theory states that it is derived from the common Germanic element hari meaning "army, warrior". Used all over Europe
 Carolina, Carla, Carlota = female versions of the Germanic name 'Karl' above
 Clodoaldo =
 Clodomir =
 Clodovil =
 Clotilde = form of the Germanic name Chlotichilda which was composed of the elements hlud "fame" and hild "battle". Saint Clotilde was the wife of the Frankish king Clovis, whom she converted to Christianity. Used in France, Portugal, Italy, Spain
 Clóvis =
 Conrado = from the Germanic elements kuoni "brave" and rad "counsel". This was the name of a 10th-century saint and bishop of Konstanz, in southern Germany. Variants: Konrad, Kurt (German), Dino (Croatian), Konrád (Czech), Konrad (Danish), Koenraad, Koen, Koert (Dutch), Konrád (Hungarian), Corrado, Corradino, Dino (Italian), Konrad (Norwegian), Kondrat, Konrad (Polish), Konrád (Slovak), Konrad (Slovene), Conrado (Spanish), Konrad (Swedish)
 Cremilde =
 Deolinda = from the Germanic name Theudelinda, derived from the elements theud "people" and linde "soft, tender". In decline, mainly used in Portugal, Brazil and Galicia
 Duarte = "Edward", from Germanic Ead "rich" and Weard "guardian"
 Dieter = from ancient Germanic Theudhar, derived from the elements theud "people" and hari "army"
 Djalma =
 Eberardo =
 Edgar =
 Edite, Edith = from the Old English name Eadgyð, derived from the elements ead "wealth, fortune" and gyð "war". It was popular among Anglo-Saxon royalty, being borne for example by Saint Eadgyeth;, the daughter of King Edgar the Peaceful. Variants: Edyth, Edytha (English), Edit (Swedish), Edita (Croatian), Edita (Czech), Édith (French), Edit (Hungarian), Edita (Lithuanian), Eda (Medieval English), Edyta (Polish), Edita (Slovak), Edita (Slovene)
 Edmar =
 Edmundo = Portuguese form of EDMUND. In other European languages: Eadmund (Anglo-Saxon), Edmund, Ed, Eddie, Eddy, Ned (English), Edmond, Edmé (French), Edmund (German), Ödön, Ödi (Hungarian), Éamonn, Eamon, Éamon (Irish), Edmondo (Italian), Edmao, Mao (Limburgish), Edmund (Polish)
 Edna =
 Eduardo = see 'Duarte' above
 Eduarda =
 Eduvigis =
 Edvaldo =
 Edvino = Portuguese form of Edwin, from the Old English elements ead "wealth, fortune" and wine "friend"
 Egil = from the Old Norse name Egill, a diminutive of names that began with the element agi "awe, terror"
 Elba =
 Elder =
 Elgar = from Old English ælf ("elf") and gar ("spear")
 Elidérico = from Germanic Aldric derived from the elements ald "old" and ric "ruler, mighty".
 Elmar, Elmer = from the Old English name ÆÐELMÆR
 Elvira =
 Elsa, Elza =
 Eurico, Érico, Eric, Erik = From Old High German êwa "time, age, law" combined with rîcja "powerful, strong, mighty." The second element is also closely related to Celtic rîg or rix and Gothic reiks, which all mean "king, ruler." However, this name can also be a short form of Eburic. Euric was the name of a 5th-century king of the Visigoths.
 Ermenegildo =
 Ermelindo =
 Ernesto = Portuguese form of Ancient Germanic 'ERNST' used in German, Dutch, Danish, Norwegian, Swedish, Dutch, English 'ERNEST'
 Ernestina =
 Etelvina =
 Evaldo = from the ancient Germanic name Ewald, composed of the elements ewa "law, custom" and wald "rule"
 Evelina, Ivelina, Avelina, Evelyne, Evelin = from the Norman French form of the Germanic name Avelina, a diminutive of AVILA. Variants: Eileen, Evelina, Avaline (English), Ava, Avelina, Aveza, Avila (Ancient Germanic), Evelien, Eveline (Dutch), Evelin (Estonian), Eveliina (Finnish), Eveline, Évelyne (French), Ava, Evelin (German), Evelin (Hungarian), Eibhlín, Eileen, Aileen (Irish), Evelina, Lina (Italian), Ewelina (Polish), Aileen (Scottish), Evelina (Swedish)
 Francisco, Francisca = FRANCISCUS, FRANZISKA from Ancient Germanic form of Franciscus (see FRANCIS, Franz, Frans, François, Francisque, Francesco, Francesc, Pranciškus)
 Fernando, Fernão, Fernandino = from a Germanic name composed of the elements fardi "journey" and nand "daring, brave". The Visigoths brought the name to the Iberian Peninsula, where it entered into the royal families of Spain and Portugal. From there it became common among the Habsburg royal family of the Holy Roman Empire and Austria, starting with the Spanish-born Ferdinand I in the 16th century. A notable bearer was Portuguese explorer Ferdinand Magellan (1480-1521), called Fernão de Magalhães in Portuguese, who was the leader of the first expedition to sail around the earth. Variants: Fernand (French), Ferdinand, Ferdi (German), Ferdinand, Ferdi (Dutch), Ferdie, Ferdy (English), Veeti, Vertti (Finnish), Ferran (Catalan), Ferdinánd, Nándor (Hungarian), Ferdinando (Italian), Ferdynand (Polish), Fernando, Hernando, Hernán, Nando (Spanish)
 Fernanda = same as above
 Frederico, Fred =  form of a Germanic name meaning "peaceful ruler", derived from frid "peace" and ric "ruler, power". This name has long been common in continental Germanic-speaking regions, being borne by rulers of the Holy Roman Empire, Germany, Austria, Scandinavia, and Prussia. Variants: Bedřich (Czech), Frederik (Danish), Frederik, Fred, Freek, Frits, Rik (Dutch), Fredrik, Veeti (Finnish), Frédéric, Fred (French), Fedde (Frisian), Friedrich, Fiete, Fred, Fritz (German), Frigyes (Hungarian), Friðrik (Icelandic), Federico, Federigo, Fredo (Italian), Fricis, Frīdrihs (Latvian), Fredrik (Norwegian), Fryderyk (Polish), Friderik (Slovene), Federico (Spanish), Fredrik (Swedish)
 Genival =
 Geraldo =
 Germano =
 Germana =
 Gertrudes = from Ancient Germanic Geretrudis, Gertrud. Used all over Europe with variations
 Gilberto, Gil =
 Gildo =
 Gilmar =
 Giraldo =
 Gisele, Gisela =
 Godiva =
 Godofredo = from Germanic Godafrid, which meant "peace of god" from the Germanic elements god "god" and frid "peace"
 Gonçalo =  from Ancient Germanic Gundisalvus. See Gonçal (Catalan), Gonzalo (Spanish)
 Gualberto = from the Germanic name Waldobert, composed of the elements wald "rule" and beraht "bright". Variants: Gaubert (French), Wob, Wubbe (Dutch), Wob, Wobbe, Wubbe (Frisian)
 Gualter = see also Valter/Walter
 Guido =
 Guilherme = Portuguese equivalent of William in English, from Ancient Germanic Wilhelm or n Willahelm. See Breton: Gwilherm. Used all over Europe in numerous variations
 Guilhermina =
 Guímaro, Guimaro = derived from old Visigothic ‘Vímar, Vímara’, from ‘Weimar’, a name from any of several places called Weimar in Hesse and Thuringia, from Old High German wīh "holy" and mari "standing water".
 Guiomar =  from the Germanic name Wigmar, which is formed of the elements wig "war, battle" and meri "famous"
 Gumercindo =
 Gustavo = from Gundstaf, possibly means "staff of the Goths", derived from the Old Norse elements Gautr "Goth" and stafr "staff". Used all over Europe
 Haroldo = from Old Norse Haraldr derived from the elements here "army" and weald "power, leader, ruler". Variants: Hariwald (Ancient Germanic), Hereweald (Anglo-Saxon), Harald (Danish), Harold (English), Harri (Finnish), Harald (German), Haraldur (Icelandic), Aroldo (Italian), Harald (Norwegian), Haroldo (Spanish), Harald (Swedish), Harri (Welsh)
 Hedda =
 Hélder, Helder, Elder = maybe from the name of the Dutch town of Den Helder (meaning "hell's door" in Dutch) or derived from the Germanic given name HULDERIC; elments hulda "merciful, graceful" and ric "power, rule".
 Helga =
 Hélmut = from the Germanic name Helmut, formed of the elements helm "helmet" and muot "spirit, mind"
 Heloísa =
 Henrique = Germanic name Heimirich meaning "home ruler", composed of the elements heim "home" and ric "ruler". It was later commonly spelled Heinrich, with the spelling altered due to the influence of other Germanic names like Haganrich, in which the first element is hagan "enclosure". Used throughout Europe and the Caucasus: Heimirich, Heinrich, Henricus(Ancient Germanic) Henrik(Armenian) Endika(Basque) Enric(Catalan) Henrik(Croatian) Jindřich, Hynek, Jindra(Czech) Henrik, Henning(Danish) Hendrick, Hendrik, Henricus, Heike, Heiko, Hein, Henk, Hennie, Henny, Rik(Dutch) Hendrik, Indrek(Estonian) Harri, Henri, Henrikki, Heikki(Finnish) Henri(French) Heike, Heiko(Frisian) Anri(Georgian) Heinrich, Hendrik, Henrik, Heiner, Heinz, Henning(German) Henrik(Hungarian) Hinrik(Icelandic) Anraí, Einrí(Irish) Enrico, Arrigo, Enzo, Rico(Italian) Indriķis, Ints(Latvian) Henrikas, Herkus(Lithuanian) Hinnerk, Hinrich, Heike, Heiko(Low German) Herry(Medieval English) Henrik, Henning(Norwegian) Henryk(Polish) Henrique(Portuguese) Eanraig, Hendry(Scottish) Henrich(Slovak) Henrik(Slovene) Enrique, Kike, Quique(Spanish) Henrik, Henning(Swedish) Harri(Welsh)
 Henriqueta = Portuguese and Galician feminine form of HENRIQUE.
 Heraldo = from the Old English name Hereweald, derived from the elements here "army" and weald "power, leader, ruler". The Old Norse cognate Haraldr was also common among Scandinavian settlers in England. This was the name of five kings of Norway and three kings of Denmark. See also Harold and Harald.
 Herberto, Heriberto =
 Herman, Hermano =  from the Germanic elements hari "army" and man "man". Used in English, Dutch, Swedish, Norwegian, Danish, Slovene
 Hermenegildo = from a Visigothic name which meant "complete sacrifice" from the Germanic elements ermen "whole, entire" and gild "sacrifice, value". It was borne by a 6th-century saint, the son of Liuvigild the Visigothic king of Hispania. Used in Western Europe: Erminigild (Ancient Germanic), Ermenegilde (French), Hermenegild (German), Ermenegildo (Italian), Hermenegildo (Spanish)
 Hermínio =
 Herminia =
 Hilda, Ilda = From Proto-Germanic Hildr (Ancient Scandinavian), Hild, Hilda (Anglo-Saxon), used in Western Europe= Hilda (Danish), Hilda, Hilde (Dutch), Hilda (English), Hilda, Hilde (German), Hildur (Icelandic), Hildr (Norse Mythology), Hilda, Hilde, Hildur (Norwegian), Hilda (Spanish), Hilda, Hildur (Swedish)
 Hildeberto, Hildiberto = Portuguese variant of Hildebert, Hilbert, from the Germanic elements hild "battle" and beraht "bright"
 Hildebrando =
 Hildegardo =
 Hugo =
 Humberto =
 Idália, Idalina, Ida = Originally a medieval short form of names beginning with the Old Frankish element idal, extended form of Old Frankish id meaning "work, labour" (cf. Ida). Used in Western Europe
 Ildefonso = from Ancient Germanic Hildefons
 Inga =
 Ingrid =
 Isilda = * possibly Germanic, perhaps from a hypothetic name like Ishild, composed of the elements is "ice, iron" and hild "battle". Could be an early version of Isolda.
 Isnard =
 Ivo = Germanic name, originally a short form of names beginning with the Germanic element iv meaning "yew". Alternative theories suggest that it may in fact be derived from a cognate Celtic element. This was the name of several saints (who are also commonly known as Saint Yves or Ives). Variants: Yvo (German), Yvo (Dutch), Erwan, Erwann (Breton), Yves, Yvon (French), Ives (History), Iwo (Polish)
 Ivone = female version of Ivo
 Juscelino, Joscelino = from a Germanic masculine name, variously written as Gaudelenus, Gautselin, Gauzlin, along with many other spellings. It was derived from the Germanic element Gaut, which was from the name of the Germanic tribe the Gauts, combined with a Latin diminutive suffix.
 Lars =
 Leonardo =
 Leonildo =
 Leonor, Eleonor, Eleonora = from Occitan Aliénor derived from Ancient Germanic Eanor
 Leopoldo = from the Germanic elements leud "people" and bald "bold". The spelling was altered due to association with Latin leo "lion". Used in Western Europe
 Liduína = female form derived from Ludwin, Leutwin or Liutwin. There are instances where the first element of the name can also be derived from Old High German hlûd "famous"
 Lindolfo =
 Lorelei =
 Lotário =
 Luís, Luiz, Aloisio, Aloysio, Ludovico = from Ancient Germanic Chlodovech, Clodovicus, Ludovicus, Clovis, Hludowig. Used all over Europe
 Luisa =
 Mafalda = variant of ‘Matilde’ (Matilda) in Portuguese and Italian. From the Germanic name Mahthildis meaning "strength in battle", from the elements maht "might, strength" and hild "battle". Saint Matilda was the wife of the 10th-century German king Henry I the Fowler. The name was common in many branches of European royalty in the Middle Ages.
 Manfred =
 Matilde = from the Germanic name Mahthildis meaning "strength in battle", from the elements maht "might, strength" and hild "battle". Used mainly in Western Europe: Mathilda, Maud, Maude(English) Mathilda(Swedish) Mahthildis, Mathilda(Ancient Germanic) Matylda(Czech) Mathilde, Tilde(Danish) Machteld, Mathilde, Mechteld, Maud, Til(Dutch) Mahaut, Mathilde, Maud(French) Mathilde, Mechthild, Mechtilde(German) Matild(Hungarian) Mafalda, Matilde(Italian & Portuguese) Til(Limburgish) Mathilde(Norwegian) Matylda(Polish) Matilde(Spanish) Mallt(Welsh)
 Nivaldo =
 Norberto = from the Germanic elements nord "north" and beraht "bright". Variants: Norberto (Italian), Norbaer, Baer, Bèr, Nor (Limburgish), Norberto (Spanish)
 Odorico =
 Olavo = from Old Norse Áleifr meaning "ancestor's descendant", derived from the elements anu "ancestor" and leifr "descendant". This was the name of five kings of Norway, including Saint Olaf (Olaf II). Used mainly in Northern Europe: Olaf, Olav, Oluf, Ole (Danish), Olaf (Dutch), Olev (Estonian), Olavi, Uolevi, Olli (Finnish), Olaf (German), Ólafur (Icelandic), Amhlaoibh (Irish), Olaf, Olav, Ola, Ole (Norwegian), Olaf (Polish), Amhlaidh, Aulay (Scottish), Olof, Olov, Ola, Olle (Swedish)
 Osmar =
 Osvaldo, Oswaldo = Portuguese variant of Oswald, from the Old English elements os "god" and weald "power, ruler". See also Old Norse name Ásvaldr.
 Osvalda, Osvaldina = female form of Osvaldo
 Oto, Otto = short form of various names beginning with the Germanic element aud meaning "wealth, fortune". Used mainly in Northern & Western Europe: Audo, Odilo, Odo, Otto (Ancient Germanic), Otto (Danish), Otto (Dutch), Otto (English), Otto (Finnish), Otto, Udo (German), Ottó (Hungarian), Ottó (Icelandic), Oddo, Ottone, Ottorino (Italian), Ode (Medieval English), Eudes (Medieval French), Otto (Norwegian), Otto (Swedish)
 Raimundo =  from Proto-Germanic *raginaz («council») and *mundō («protection»), Raymund
 Ramiro =  Latinized form of the Visigothic name 'Ramirus' (Raginmar) derived from the Germanic elements ragin "advice" and meri "famous". Rare, mainly in Portugal and Spain.
 Raul =
 Reginaldo, Reinaldo, Ronaldo, Reynaldo = from the Germanic name Raginald, made of elements ragin "advice" and wald "rule". Used in Western Europe: Ragnvald (Danish), Reinoud, Reinout (Dutch), Reino (Finnish), Renaud, Reynaud (French), Reinhold (German), Raghnall (Irish), Rinaldo (Italian), Ragnvald (Norwegian), Raghnall, Ranald, Ronald (Scottish), Reynaldo (Spanish), Ragnvald (Swedish), Rheinallt (Welsh)
 Ricardo = from the Germanic elements ric "power, rule" and hard "brave, hardy". Used all over Europe: Ricard (Catalan), Richard (Czech), Rikard (Danish), Richard (Dutch), Richard, Dick, Rich, Richie, Rick, Rickey, Ricki, Rickie, Ricky, Ritchie (English), Rikhard, Riku (Finnish), Richard (French), Richard (German), Richárd, Rikárd (Hungarian), Risteárd (Irish), Riccardo (Italian), Rihards (Latvian), Ričardas (Lithuanian), Rikard (Norwegian), Ryszard (Polish), Rihard (Slovene), Rikard (Swedish), Rhisiart (Welsh)
 Roberto =
 Roberta =
 Rodrigo = from Germanic Hrodric/Hrēðrīc/Rørik/Hrœrekr (Roderick, Rodrick, Roderich; a compound of hrod ‘renown’ + ric ‘power(ful)’), from the Proto-Germanic *Hrōþirīk(i)az; it was borne by the last of the Visigoth kings and is one of the most common Lusophone personal names of Germanic origin.[]
 Rodolfo = Portuguese variation from Ancient Germanic 'Hrodulf', 'Hrolf', 'Hrólfr', Hróðólfr (Ancient Scandinavian), Hrothulf, Hroðulf (Anglo-Saxon), Rudolf (Armenian), Rudolf (Croatian), Rudolf (Czech), Rolf, Rudolf (Danish), Roelof, Rudolf, Rodolf, Roel, Ruud (Dutch), Rolf, Rollo, Rudolph, Rodolph, Rolph, Rudy (English), Rodolphe, Rodolph (French), Rolf, Rudolf, Rodolf, Rudi (German), Ruedi (German (Swiss)), Rudolf, Rudi (Hungarian), Roul (Medieval English), Roul (Medieval French), Rolf, Rudolf (Norwegian), Rudolf (Polish), Rudolf (Russian), Rudolf (Slovene), Rolf, Rudolf, Roffe (Swedish)
 Rogério = from Proto-Germanic Hrodger, Hróarr, Hróðgeirr (Ancient Scandinavian), Hroðgar (Anglo-Saxon), used in Western Europe = Roger (Danish), Roger, Rogier, Rutger (Dutch), Roger, Rodge, Rodger (English), Roger (French), Roger, Rüdiger (German), Ruggero, Ruggiero (Italian), Ruth (Limburgish), Roar, Roger (Norwegian), Roger (Swedish)
 Rolando, Orlando, Roldão = from Proto-Germanic  Hrodland used all over Europe = Roeland, Roland, Roel (Dutch), Roland, Rolland, Roly, Rowland, Rowley (English), Roland (French), Roland (German), Loránd, Lóránt, Roland (Hungarian), Orlando, Rolando (Italian), Rolan (Russian), Rolando, Roldán (Spanish), Roland (Swedish)
 Romildo =
 Rosalina, Rosalinda = from Ancient Germanic Roslindis. Used in Western Europe
 Rui = Equivalent to English Roy (Roderick) from Ancient Germanic Hroderich. Used in Western Europe: Roderic (Catalan), Roderick, Rod, Roddy (English), Rodrigue (French), Rodrigo, Roi (Galician), Rodrigo (Italian), Rodrigo, Ruy (Spanish)
 Ubaldo =
 Ulrico =
 Wagner =
 Waldemar, Valdemar =
 Waldevino, Balduíno =  from Proto-Germanic Baldovin, Baldwin, used in Western Europe= Boudewijn (Dutch), Baldwin (English), Baudouin (French), Baldovino, Baldo (Italian), Balduino (Spanish), Maldwyn (Welsh)
 Waldir =
 Waldo =
 Walfredo =
 Walter, Valter =
 Wanda, Vanda =
 Wania, Vânia =
 Wilfried, Vilfredo = from Proto-Germanic Willifrid, Wilfrith, Wilfrið (Anglo-Saxon), used in Western Europe= Guifré (Catalan), Vilfred (Danish), Wilfred, Wilfrid, Wil, Wilf (English), Wilfried (German), Vilfredo (Italian) Wilfredo (Spanish)
 Wolfgang =

Surnames
 Abreu = toponymic, from “Avredo” (avi + redo) derived from Gothic 'avi' grace and 'redo' to give, to offer. See Norman-French Évreux
 Afonso = patronymic of the same name
 Antunes = patronymic form of Antonio
 Aires = Germanic hypocorism of 'Hari' or 'Hêri' meaning army
 Araújo, Araujo = toponymic, from Gothic 'Ruderic' 
 Arnaldes = patronymic of Germ. 'Arnold(us)'
 Arouca = toponymic, derived from Frankish or Gaulish *rusk (iris) maybe via old French 'rouche'
 Alencar, Alenquer = toponymic, derived from Ancient Germanic “Alankerk” (Alan + kerk, temple of the Alans) referring to the Alans
 Alves, Álvares = patronymic form of Álvaro
 Bandeira = from Ancient Germanic  *bandwa, band-
 Beltrão = patronymic of the same name
 Berenguer, Beringer, Berengar = derived from Ancient Germanic 'Geir', 'Ger' meaning bear and spear (see Geraldo= Gerald)
 Bernardes = patronymic form of Bernardo
 Branco = from Germanic 'blank' (white, fair)
 Esteves = patronymic form of Estêvão
 Fernandes = patronymic form of Fernando, archaic Fernão
 Geraldes, Giraldes = patronymic form of Geraldo
 Gonçalves = patronymic form of Gonçalo
 Gondesendes, Gondesende = toponymic form of Germanic 'Gondesindus', 'Gondisalvus'
 Guarda, Guardão = from Germanic 'wardon' (to guard, watch)
 Guedes = patronymic form of Guede < Latinised vădu, < Germanic vâd or Weit
 Guerra = from Gothic 'wirro' (war)
 Guerrinha = from Gothic 'wirro' (war)
 Guerreiro = from Gothic 'wirros' (warrior)
 Gusmão = from Gothic 'gutsman' (goodman)
 Guterres = patronymic form of Guterre
 Henriques = patronymic form of Henrique
 Martins = patronymic form of Martim, Martinho
 Mendes = patronymic form of Menendo (short form of Hermenergildo)
 Moniz = patronymic form of archaic Moninho or Munio
 Norberto = patronymic of the same name, from Germanic Nordberctus, elements 'nort' (north)+ berth (illustrious)
 Nunes = patronymic form of Nuno
 Resende, Rezende = toponymic of Resende, from Suebian 'sinde' and 'sende', derived from the Germanic "sinths" (military expedition)
 Ródão = from ancient Germanic H1reiH- 'flow, river'
 Rodrigues = patronymic form of Rodrigo
 Roldão = patronymic form of the same name, variant of Roland
 Sá = from Germanic 'sal' (room, building)
 Saavedra = combination of Germanic 'sal' + Latin 'vetus< vetera (old)
 Salas = from Germanic 'sal' (room, building)
 Sousa, Souza = Visigothic toponymic, from archaic 'Souza'
 Velêz, Velez = from Visigothic baptismal name 'Vigila' (Wigila), patronymic of Vela (Veila, derived from Vigila).
 Viegas= patronymic form of Egas

List

A
 abandonar; abandono = "to abandon" ; "abandon"
 atacar = "to attack"
 abordar = "to attack (a problem)"

B
 bala =
 balcão = "balcony"
 bandeira =
 bandoleiro = "bandit"
 banquete =
 barão =
 bébé or bebê (Brazil) = "baby"
 bife = "beefsteak"
 bigode = "moustache"  (from German Bei Gott, "By God")
 bisonte
 branco; branca = "white"
 bloco; bloquear = "block; to block"
 bordar = "to embroider"
 bote = "boat"
 bramar = "to bellow, roar"
 brecha = "breach, opening"
 brinde = "toast(with drinks)"
 brio= "spirit", "brio" (Celtic???)
 brisa = "breeze" (Old Spanish briza from East Frisian brisen, to blow fresh and strong)
 brocha =
 brotar = "to sprout"
 buganvília  = "bougainvillea"
 burguês = "bourgeoisie", "member of the middle class"
 busca; buscar = "search, find, look for"

C
 carpa = "carp"
 chocar = "to crash, collide"
 clube = "club, association"
 cobalto = "cobalt"
 comarca = "comarch"
 correia = "strap, belt, leash"

D
 dália = dahlia (named for Swedish 18th century botanist Anders Dahl)
 dinamarquês = "a Dane, a citizen of the Kingdom of Denmark"
 dança; dançar = "dance; to dance"
 dardo = "a dart"
 debute =
 dique = "a dikewall"
 dólar = "a dollar"

E
 edredão, edredom = "eiderdown"
 emboscar = "to ambush"
 embraiagem = "clutch"
 enriquecer = "get rich"
 estampar = "to stamp"
 estampida = same as "estampido"; bang, beat, blow (sound like a shot)
 estandarte
 este = "east"
 estuco; estuque =

F
 falar
 feudal
 feudo
 flibusteiro
 filme = movie, picture
 filtro; filtrar
 flutuar; frota; flotilha
 folclore = from English folklore
 fornido; fornecido
 forragem
 forrar
 framboesa
 francês
 franco (candid)
 franco (money)
 franquear = free, no charge, no cost, for free,
 frasco = bottle, urn, pot, vase, container
 fresco = chilly, icy, freesing, cold
 futebol = football (soccer)

G
 gabardine; gabardina
 gaita
 galante
 galardão
 galope
 gado
 ganhar
 ganso; gansa
 garagem
 garantia
 garbo
 gardênia
 garrote
 gavião
 gravar
 gripe, gripa
 grisalho
 groselha
 grupo
 gadanha
 guarida
 guarnição
 guerra = germ. warra, lat. bellum
 guerrilha
 gueto
 guia = "a guide"
 guiar
 guilhotina
 guião
 grinalda
 guisa
 guisar

H
 heraldo

I
 inglês
 instalar

J
 jardim

K

L
 lastro
 lata
 lista
 lote
 lotaria
 lua-de-mel (calque)

M
 maleta
 Malta
 maquiagem, maquilagem
 marcar
 marcha
 marchar
 marechal
 marquês
 marquesa
 marta
 mascote
 mação
 mastro

N
 nórdico
 normando
 norte

O
 oeste = "west"
 orgulho = pride

P
 palco
 paquete
 placa

Q
 queque = "cake"
 quinquilharia = "old junk", "cheap antiques shop"

R
 rancho
 raça = "race (lineage)" from Italian raza of Gmc origin, akin to OHG rīga, line; OE ræw, row
 raspar
 rata
 ratão
 refrescar
 refutar (Gmc origin???)
 reno
 retaguarda
 rico
 rifa
 rifle
 riqueza
 roubar
 roubo
 rum
 roupa
 rufião
 rumba
 russo

S
 sala
 salão
 saxofone
 sopa
 sud- /sul
 sueco
 suíço

T
 tacha
 taco
 tacão
 talar
 tampão
 tapa
 tapar
 tarjeta
 teta
 teutônico
 toalha
 toldo
 tope
 trampa
 trégua
 trepar
 trombone
 trompa
 trompeta
 tropa
 trotar
 tungstênio (Tungsten)

U
 ufano

V
 vagão
 valquíria
 valsa
 vadio
 vandalismo
 vândalo
 varão
 venda
 vermute

W
 wagneriano

X

Z
 zinco zinc

See also
 History of the Portuguese language
 List of French words of Germanic origin
 List of Galician words of Germanic origin
 Portuguese vocabulary

External links
 Portuguese words of Germanic origin

References

Portuguese Germanic
Germanic